George Washington High School is a public 4–year high school located in the East Side neighborhood on the far southeast side of Chicago, Illinois, United States. Washington is operated by the Chicago Public Schools district. Washington serves the students of nearby neighborhoods: Hegewisch,  South Deering. The school is named for the first President of the United States, George Washington.

Athletics
Washington competes in the Chicago Public League (CPL) and is a member of the Illinois High School Association (IHSA). Washington sport teams are nicknamed Patriots. The boys' basketball team were regional champions in 2005–06 and 2006–07. The boys' soccer team were IHSA Regional Champions in 2009–10, 2010–11, 2011–12, 2012–13, 2013–14, 2014–15, 2015–16, 2017–18, 2020–2021. IHSA Sectional Champions in 2012–13, 2014–15, 2015–16, 2017–18, 2020–2021. IHSA Supersectionals Champions in 2012–13, 2014–15, 2020–2021. The girls' basketball team were Public League champions in 1990–91 and 1999–2000. The boys soccer team won the IHSA State Championship in 2012–13. The Boys soccer team finished 4th place in IHSA state in 2015–16. The Boys soccer team placed 3rd place in IHSA state in 2020–2021. The Boys soccer team were the Chicago Public League Champions for the first time in 2016–17. The boys soccer team were runner ups for the Chicago Public League  in 2017-2018 and 2020–2021.

References

External links
 George Washington High School at Chicago Public Schools website

Public high schools in Chicago